The Lord of the Rings is a series of three epic fantasy adventure films directed by Peter Jackson, based on the novel The Lord of the Rings by J. R. R. Tolkien. The films are subtitled The Fellowship of the Ring (2001), The Two Towers (2002), and The Return of the King (2003). Produced and distributed by New Line Cinema with the co-production of WingNut Films, the series is an international venture between New Zealand and the United States. The films feature an ensemble cast including Elijah Wood, Ian McKellen, Liv Tyler, Viggo Mortensen, Sean Astin, Cate Blanchett, John Rhys-Davies, Christopher Lee, Billy Boyd, Dominic Monaghan, Orlando Bloom, Hugo Weaving, Andy Serkis and Sean Bean.

Set in the fictional world of Middle-earth, the films follow the hobbit Frodo Baggins as he and the Fellowship embark on a quest to destroy the One Ring, to ensure the destruction of its maker, the Dark Lord Sauron. The Fellowship eventually splits up and Frodo continues the quest with his loyal companion Sam and the treacherous Gollum. Meanwhile, Aragorn, heir in exile to the throne of Gondor, along with the elf Legolas, the dwarf Gimli, Merry, Pippin, and the wizard Gandalf, unite to save the Free Peoples of Middle-earth from the forces of Sauron and rally them in the War of the Ring to aid Frodo by distracting Sauron's attention.

The three films were shot simultaneously in Jackson's native New Zealand from 11 October 1999 until 22 December 2000, with pick-up shots done from 2001 to 2003. It was one of the biggest and most ambitious film projects ever undertaken, with a budget of $281 million (equivalent to $ million in ). The first film in the series premiered at the Odeon Leicester Square in London on 10 December 2001; the second film premiered at the Ziegfeld Theatre in New York City on 5 December 2002; the third film premiered at the Embassy Theatre in Wellington on 1 December 2003. An extended edition of each film was released on home video a year after its release in cinemas.

The Lord of the Rings is widely regarded as one of the greatest and most influential film series ever made. It was a major financial success and is among the highest-grossing film series of all time with $2.991 billion in worldwide receipts. All three films received widespread acclaim from critics and audiences, who lauded the acting, direction, writing, production values, score, ambition, emotional depth, groundbreaking special effects and faithfulness to the source material. The series received numerous accolades, winning 17 Academy Awards out of 30 total nominations, including Best Picture for The Return of the King. In 2021, The Fellowship of the Ring was selected for preservation in the United States National Film Registry by the Library of Congress for being "culturally, historically, or aesthetically significant".

Films

The Fellowship of the Ring

The Two Towers

The Return of the King

Cast and crew

Casting 
Jackson began abstract discussions on casting during the development of the scripts with Miramax. Jackson, Walsh and Boyens compiled a casting wishlist, which included Cate Blanchett for Galadriel and Ian Holm for Bilbo. Wondering whether Patrick Stewart would be right for the part of Gandalf, Philippa Boyens drew a tape of him performing opposite Ian McKellen, only to suggest the latter to Jackson. McKellen became Jackson's first choice for Gandalf. Christopher Lee sent Jackson a photograph of him in a wizard's costume, wanting to play Gandalf, but Jackson decided Lee would instead be better as Saruman.

Miramax wanted a recognisable name for Gandalf, and suggested Max von Sydow or Paul Scofield and, wanting an American star, even mentioned Morgan Freeman. When New Line took over, they suggested Christopher Plummer or Sean Connery for the part (both declined), and put a veto against Richard Harris when his name came up. When von Sydow inquired for the part later, his agent told him they were looking for an English actor.

While casting, Jackson looked for backup options for the various parts, including Lucy Lawless and Nicole Kidman for Galadriel; Anthony Hopkins or Sylvester McCoy (eventually cast as Radagast in The Hobbit trilogy) for Bilbo; Paul Scofield, Jeremy Irons, Malcolm McDowell or Tim Curry for Saruman. For Gandalf, they looked into Tom Baker, Tom Wilkinson, Sam Neill, Bernard Hill (who was instead cast as Théoden) and Peter O'Toole, and into several older actors who auditioned for other parts, such as Patrick McGoohan and Anthony Hopkins.

Miramax and Jackson discussed Sir Daniel Day-Lewis for Aragorn, starting "fanciful internet speculation" that Day-Lewis was approached for the part numerous times, although Jackson eventually inquired about him. Jackson cast Stuart Townsend, whom the studio deemed too young. After shooting began, Jackson agreed and decided to recast the role. They approached Viggo Mortensen, but also spoke to Russell Crowe (who auditioned for Boromir previously), as a backup choice.

Patrick McGoohan, their first choice for Denethor, proved "quite grumpy" when they met, and they instead looked into Donald Sutherland and John Rhys-Davies, and ultimately cast John Noble. Davies was recast as Gimli, instead of Billy Connolly (later cast as Dáin in The Hobbit: The Battle of the Five Armies), Robert Trebor and Timothy Spall. In conversations with Miramax, Liam Neeson's name came up for Boromir, but he declined. New Line suggested Nicolas Cage, but the filmmakers declined and cast Sean Bean.

Cast 

The following are the cast members who voiced or portrayed characters appearing in the extended version of the films.

Crew

Development

Previous attempts 

Previous attempts to film Tolkien's works were made by William Snyder, Peter Shaffer and John Boorman. These attempts resulted in a couple of unproduced scripts, concept art and an animated short. Other filmmakers and producers to have had an interest in adapting Tolkien are said to include Walt Disney, Al Brodax, Forrest Ackerman, Denis O'Dell (who considered Richard Lester to direct, but instead approached David Lean, Stanley Kubrick and Michelangelo Antonioni) and George Lucas. The rights to adapt Tolkien's works passed through the hands of several studios, having been briefly leased to Rembrandt Films before being sold perpetually to United Artists. In 1976, UA passed the rights to The Lord of the Rings (and a part of the rights to The Hobbit) to Fantasy Films.

In 1977, an animated adaptation of The Hobbit was produced as a TV special by Rankin and Bass, and in 1978 Ralph Bakshi made an animated feature of the first half of The Lord of the Rings. While profitable, the film did not make enough money to automatically warrant the sequel which would close the story, and an argument with producer Saul Zaentz led Bakshi to abandon the project. Rankin/Bass then followed in 1980 with an animated TV adaptation of The Return of the King. Several other Tolkienesque fantasy films were produced at the time, including Jim Henson and Frank Oz's The Dark Crystal and Lucas's Willow.

At the time of the release of Bakshi's film, a teenaged Peter Jackson had not read the book, but "heard the name", and went to see the film: "I liked the early part—it had some quaint sequences in Hobbiton, a creepy encounter with the Black Rider on the road, and a few quite good battle scenes—but then, about half way through, the storytelling became very disjointed and disorientating and I really didn't understand what was going on. However, what it did do was to make me want to read the book—if only to find out what happened!" Jackson bought a tie-in paperback edition. He later read The Hobbit and The Silmarillion, and listened to the 1981 BBC radio adaptation. Assuming someone would one day adapt it to a live-action film, Jackson read up on some previous attempts to bring the piece to the screen. He had not watched the Rankin and Bass TV specials.

Pitch to Miramax 

In 1995, while completing post-production on The Frighteners, Jackson and Fran Walsh discussed making an original fantasy film, but could not think of a scenario that was not Tolkien-esque, and eventually decided to look up the film rights. They went to Harvey Weinstein from Miramax, who got the rights from Saul Zaentz. Jackson knew it would take multiple films to do Tolkien justice, but initially pitched a single trilogy: one film based on The Hobbit and, if that would prove successful, two Lord of the Rings films shot back-to-back. Jackson began rereading The Hobbit, looking at illustrations and commissioning concept art from the book, but the rights eventually proved unattainable, having been split between Zaentz and United Artists. Weinstein tried to buy the studio's share of the rights, but was unsuccessful.

With The Hobbit postponed for a later prequel, Jackson proceeded with making two or more Lord of the Rings films: "We pitched the idea of three films and Miramax didn't really want to take that risk, but we agreed on two." He began writing the scripts with Walsh and Stephen Sinclair, storyboarding with Christian Rivers and discussing casting ideas with the Weinsteins. Meanwhile, Weta Digital began software development for the digital effects required, and WETA Workshop were producing props and concept art. Sinclair later dropped out of the project, but Jackson felt that some of his contributions survived into the finished scripts, particularly the middle film, The Two Towers, for which he is credited.

Move to New Line 

As the scripts took shape, it became clear that the budget required would exceed Miramax's capabilities. The Weinsteins suggested cutting the project to one film. Jackson inquired whether it could be around four hours in duration, but Miramax insisted on two hours, suggesting major cuts to the story, which Jackson refused. Harvey Weinstein threatened to replace Jackson with screenwriter Hossein Amini and directors John Madden or Quentin Tarantino. Jackson believed this was an empty threat to get him to concede to making a one-film version himself.

Harvey Weinstein eventually relented to putting the project on a turnaround, but the onerous conditions were meant to prevent the project from being taken up by another studio. Jackson got an audience with New Line CEO Robert Shaye, who accepted the project, but requested that it be expanded into a trilogy. New Line had many promising reasons that the trilogy would be successful, which led them to sign on. Final Cut rights were shared contractually between Jackson and Bob Shaye, but there was never any interference in Jackson's cut. Initially, each film had a production budget of $60 million, but New Line accepted Jackson's request for an increased budget after a 26-minute preview of The Fellowship of the Ring was presented at the 2001 Cannes Film Festival.

Production 

Jackson began storyboarding and screenwriting the series with Christian Rivers, Fran Walsh and Philippa Boyens in 1997 and assigned his crew to begin designing Middle-earth at the same time. Jackson, Walsh and Boyens did not write each film to correspond exactly to its respective book, opting instead to write a three-part adaptation with some sequences missing, some sequences created from scratch, and some sequences moved from one area to another regardless of its placement in the books. To allow the story to be clearer for viewers, Jackson takes a more chronological approach to the story than Tolkien's complex interlacing of storylines. During shooting, the screenplays continued to evolve, in part due to contributions from cast members looking to further explore their characters.

Earlier versions of the script included additional characters like Fatty Bolger, Glorfindel, Elladan, Elrohir, Erkenbrand, Imrahil and Forlong. At one point, Jackson even considered reintroducing Tom Bombadil in a cameo. Gimli was going to swear throughout the films, and Arwen would join the Fellowship in Rohan and share a nude scene with Aragorn in the pools of the Glittering Caves.

Jackson hired long-time collaborator Richard Taylor to lead Weta Workshop on five major design elements: armour, weapons, prosthetic makeup, creatures and miniatures. At New Line's request, animation supervisor Jim Rygiel replaced Weta Digital's Mark Stetson. In November 1997, famed Tolkien illustrators Alan Lee and John Howe joined the project; most of the imagery in the films is based on their various illustrations, but Jackson also relied on the work of Ted Nasmith, who later had to turn down an offer to join Alan and John. Jackson wanted realistic designs in the style of historical epics rather than fantasy films, citing Braveheart as an inspiration:

"It might be clearer if I described it as an historical film. Something very different to Dark Crystal or Labyrinth. Imagine something like Braveheart, but with a little of the visual magic of Legend. [...] It should have the historical authority of Braveheart, rather than the meaningless fantasy mumbo-jumbo of Willow.

Production designer Grant Major was charged with the task of converting Lee and Howe's designs into architecture, creating models of the sets, while Dan Hennah worked as art director, scouting locations and organizing the building of sets. Ngila Dickson collaborated with Richard Taylor on producing costumes, while Peter King and Peter Owen designed makeup and hair. Most of these crew members (and others) returned to work on The Hobbit.

Jackson and cinematographer Andrew Lesnie considered shooting in large format like 65 mm film and/or to master the films at 4K, but both were cost-prohibitive and couldn't be done on New Zealand soil. They decided to shoot on fine-grain Super 35 mm film and subject the films to rigorous digital grading.

Principal photography for all three films was conducted concurrently in many locations within New Zealand's conservation areas and national parks. Filming took place between 11 October 1999 and 22 December 2000. Pick-up shoots were conducted annually from 2001 to 2004. The series was shot at over 150 different locations, with seven different units shooting, as well as soundstages around Wellington and Queenstown. Along with Jackson directing the whole production, other unit directors included John Mahaffie, Geoff Murphy, Fran Walsh, Barrie M. Osborne, Rick Porras and any other assistant director, producer, or writer available. Miniature Photography took place throughout the entire period, amounting to over 1,000 shooting days.

Weta Digital developed new technologies to allow for the groundbreaking digital effects required for the trilogy, including the development of the MASSIVE software to generate intelligent crowds for battle scenes, and advancing the art of motion capture, which was used on bipedal creatures like the Cave Troll or Gollum. With Jackson's future films, motion-capture technology came to be pushed so far that it became referred to as "digital makeup", although it was later clarified that during The Lord of the Rings period, it was still fairly reliant on the CG animators.

Each film had the benefit of a full year of post-production time before its respective December release, often finishing in October–November, with the crew immediately going to work on the next film. Jackson originally wanted to edit all three films with Jamie Selkirk, but this proved too much work. The next idea was to have John Gilbert, Michael Horton and Selkirk, respectively, editing the three films simultaneously, but after a month that proved too difficult for Jackson, and the films were edited in consecutive years, although Selkirk continued to act as "Supervising Editor" on the first two entries. Daily rushes would often last up to four hours, and by the time The Fellowship of the Ring had been released, assembly cuts of the other two films (4 hours each) were already prepared. In total, 1,828 km (six million feet) of film was edited down to the 11 hours and 26 minutes (686 minutes) of extended running time.

Music 

Howard Shore composed, orchestrated, conducted and produced the trilogy's music. Shore visited the set in 1999, and composed a version of the Shire theme and Frodo's Theme before Jackson began shooting. In August 2000 he visited the set again, and watched the assembly cuts of The Fellowship of the Ring and The Return of the King. In the music, Shore included many (85 to 110) leitmotifs to represent various characters, cultures and places—the largest catalogue of leitmotifs in the history of cinema, surpassing, for comparison, that of the entire Star Wars film series. For example, there are multiple leitmotifs just for the hobbits and the Shire. Although the first film had some of its score recorded in Wellington, virtually all of the trilogy's score was recorded in Watford Town Hall and mixed at Abbey Road Studios. Jackson planned to advise the score for six weeks each year in London, though for The Two Towers he stayed for twelve.

The score is primarily played by the London Philharmonic Orchestra, ranging from 93 to 120 players throughout the recording. London Voices, the London Oratory School Schola boy choir, and many artists such as Ben Del Maestro, Sheila Chandra, Enya, Renée Fleming, James Galway, Annie Lennox and Emilíana Torrini contributed. Even actors Billy Boyd, Viggo Mortensen, Liv Tyler, Miranda Otto (extended cuts only for the latter two) and Peter Jackson (for a single gong sound in the second film) contributed to the score. Fran Walsh and Philippa Boyens served as librettists, writing lyrics to various music and songs, which David Salo translated into Tolkien's languages. The third film's end song, "Into the West", was a tribute to a young filmmaker Jackson and Walsh befriended named Cameron Duncan, who died of cancer in 2003.

Shore composed a main theme for the Fellowship rather than many different character themes, and its strength and weaknesses in volume are depicted at different points in the series. On top of that, individual themes were composed to represent different cultures. Infamously, the amount of music Shore had to write every day for the third film increased dramatically to around seven minutes. The music for the series has been voted best movie soundtrack of all time for the six years running, passing Schindler's List (1993), Gladiator (2000), Star Wars (1977) and Out of Africa (1985), respectively.

Soundtracks

Reception

Box office 

The trilogy's online promotional trailer was first released on 27 April 2000, and set a new record for download hits, registering 1.7 million hits in the first 24 hours of its release. The trailer used a selection from the soundtrack for Braveheart and The Shawshank Redemption among other cuts. In 2001, 24 minutes of footage from the series, primarily the Moria sequence, was shown at the 54th Cannes Film Festival, and was very well received. The showing also included an area designed to look like Middle-earth.

The Fellowship of the Ring was released on 19 December 2001. It grossed $47.2 million in its U.S. opening weekend and made over $897 million worldwide. A preview of The Two Towers was inserted just before the end credits near the end of the film's theatrical run. A promotional trailer was later released, containing music re-scored from the film Requiem for a Dream. The Two Towers was released 18 December 2002. It grossed $62 million in its first U.S. weekend and out-grossed its predecessor with over $947 million worldwide. The promotional trailer for The Return of the King was debuted exclusively before the New Line Cinema film Secondhand Lions on 23 September 2003. Released 17 December 2003, its first U.S. weekend gross was $72.6 million, and became the second film, after Titanic (1997), to gross over $1 billion worldwide.

Critical and public response 

The Lord of the Rings trilogy received widespread acclaim and is ranked among the greatest film trilogies ever made. Kenneth Turan of the Los Angeles Times wrote that "the trilogy will not soon, if ever, find its equal", while Todd McCarthy of Variety described the films as "one of the most ambitious and phenomenally successful dream projects of all time". The Fellowship of the Ring was voted the greatest fantasy movie of all time in a reader's poll conducted by American magazine Wired in 2012, while The Two Towers and The Return of the King placed fourth and third respectively. The Independent ranked The Lord of the Rings trilogy at No. 2 on its list of "10 greatest movie trilogies of all time". The Lord of the Rings trilogy is ranked at No. 2 in /Film'''s list of "The 15 Greatest Trilogies Of All Time", while Empire ranked it at No. 1 in its list of "The 33 Greatest Movie Trilogies".

The series appears in the Dallas–Fort Worth Film Critics Association: Top 10 Films, Times All-Time 100 Movies, and James Berardinelli's Top 100. In 2007, USA Today named the series as the most important films of the past 25 years. Entertainment Weekly put it on its end-of-the-decade, "best-of" list, saying, "Bringing a cherished book to the big screen? No sweat. Peter Jackson's trilogy — or, as we like to call it, our preciousssss — exerted its irresistible pull, on advanced Elvish speakers and neophytes alike." Paste named it one of the 50 Best Movies of the Decade (2000–2009), ranking it at No. 4.
In another Time magazine list, the series ranks second in "Best Movies of the Decade". In addition, six characters and their respective actors made the list of 'The 100 Greatest Movie Characters', also compiled by Empire, with Viggo Mortensen's portrayal of Aragorn ranking No. 15, Ian McKellen's portrayal of Gandalf ranking No. 30, Ian Holm's portrayal of Bilbo Baggins (shared with Martin Freeman for his portrayal of the same character in The Hobbit films) ranking No. 61, Andy Serkis' portrayal of Gollum ranking No. 66, Sean Astin's portrayal of Samwise Gamgee ranking No. 77, and Orlando Bloom's portrayal of Legolas ranking No. 94.

 Industry response 

The series drew acclaim from within the industry, including from the film directors Steven Spielberg, James Cameron and George Lucas. John Boorman, who once wrote a script for a Lord of the Rings film, said he was happy his own version was unmade as Jackson's film trilogy was "of such scope and magnitude that it can only be compared to the building of the great Gothic cathedrals." Forrest J. Ackerman, who once presented a film treatment to Tolkien, and appeared on Jackson's Bad Taste said his pitch "could never have been given the grand treatment that Peter Jackson afforded it." Arthur Rankin said Jackson was making "marvellous films."

However, some filmmakers were more critical. Heinz Edelmann, who pitched the idea of an animated feature when United Artists considered shooting the films with the Beatles, thought it was "badly directed." Ralph Bakshi, who made an animated film based on the first half of the trilogy, didn't watch the films, but was told that Jackson's film was derivative of his. Ahead of the films' release, he said he did not "understand it" but that he does "wish it to be a good movie." Later, he begruged Saul Zaentz for not notifying him of the live-action film, and said that Jackson had his film to study and therefore had "a little easier time than I did." Afterwards, he grumbled that Jackson "didn't understand" Tolkien and created "special effects garbage" to sell toys, as well as being derivative of his own film. Bakshi further blamed Jackson for not acknowledging the influence that the animated film had on him, saying (falsely) that he denied having seen Bakshi's film at all until being forced to mention him, at which point (according to Bakshi) he mentioned Bakshi's influence "only once" as "PR bolony." However, he did praise Jackson's special effects and, in 2015, even apologized for some of his remarks. Bakshi's animator Mike Ploog and writer Peter Beagle both praised the live-action film.

 Accolades 

The three films together were nominated for a total of 30 Academy Awards, of which they won 17, both records for any movie trilogy. The Fellowship of the Ring earned 13 nominations, the most of any film at the 74th Academy Awards, winning four; The Two Towers won two awards from six nominations at the 75th Academy Awards; The Return of the King won in every category in which it was nominated at the 76th Academy Awards, setting the current Oscar record for the highest clean sweep, and its 11 Academy Awards wins ties the record held by Ben-Hur (1959) and Titanic (1997). The Return of the King also became only the second sequel to win the Oscar for Best Picture after The Godfather Part II (1974).

Additionally, members of the production crew won the Academy Award for Technical Achievement for the rendering of skin textures on creatures on The Return of the King, and Stephen Regelous won the Academy Award for Scientific and Engineering Award for the design and development of MASSIVE, "the autonomous agent animation system used for the battle sequences in The Lord of the Rings trilogy."

Each film in the series won the Hugo Award for Best Dramatic Presentation, the MTV Movie Award for Movie of the Year, and the Saturn Award for Best Fantasy Film. The first and third films also won the BAFTA Award for Best Film. The New York Film Critics Circle awarded The Return of the King its Best Picture Award at the 2003 Awards Ceremony, hosted by Andrew Johnston, chair of the organization at that time, who called it "a masterful piece of filmmaking."

 Comparisons with the written work 

Commentators have compared Jackson's film trilogy with Tolkien's written work, remarking that while both have been extremely successful commercially, they differ in many respects. Critics have admired Jackson's ability to film the long and complex work at all; the beauty of the cinematography, sets and costumes; and the epic scale of his version of Tolkien's story. They have however found the characters and the story greatly weakened by Jackson's emphasis on action and violence at the expense of psychological depth; the loss of Tolkien's emphasis on free will and individual responsibility; and the replacement of Frodo's inner journey by an American monomyth with Aragorn as the hero.

As for whether the film trilogy is faithful to the novel, opinions range from Verlyn Flieger's feeling that a film adaptation is not even worth attempting, Wayne G. Hammond's opinion that the film sacrifices the book's richness of characterization and narrative for violence, thrills and cheap humour, or Christopher Tolkien's view that Jackson's interpretation is unacceptable, to granting, with Jackson and Boyens, that the film version is inevitably different. From that standpoint, critics such as Brian Rosebury and Tom Shippey have described the films as a partial success, giving some of the feeling and capturing some of the key themes of the novel. Yvette Kisor considers that Jackson was unfaithful to many of Tolkien's details, but succeeded in achieving something of the same impact and feelings of providence, eucatastrophe and interconnectedness. Dimitra Fimi suggests that Jackson was continuing Tolkien's tradition of adapting folklore, incorporating both the fans' views on that folklore and cinematic traditions such as the zombie in the film trilogy to produce its own modern folklore.

 Home media 

The first two films were released on two-disc standard edition DVDs containing previews of the following film. The success of the theatrical cuts brought about four-disc extended editions, with new editing, added special effects and music. Jackson came up with the idea of an extended cut for LaserDisc and DVD formats while in preproduction. He could insert some of the violence that he thought he would have to trim to get a PG-13 rating for the theatre, and he could tailor the pacing to the demands of the small screen, which he said were "completely different". Jackson has stated that he considers the theatrical cuts to be the "definitive versions" of the films due to their deliberate pacing;however, he has also said that he believes the extended cuts will be "ultimately seen as the more definitive versions of the films".

The extended cuts of the films and the supplemental special features (labelled "appendices" in homage to the books) were spread over two discs each, and a limited collector's edition was also released featuring sculpted bookends. The Fellowship of the Ring was released on 12 November 2002, containing 30 minutes of extra footage. The Two Towers, released on 18 November 2003, contains 46 minutes of extra footage. The Return of the King was released on 14 December 2004, with 52 minutes more footage. The extended cuts have also played at cinemas, most notably the first two for a 16 December 2003 marathon screening (dubbed "Trilogy Tuesday") culminating in a screening of the third film. In 2006, both versions of each film were released together in a limited edition, which includes a new feature-length documentary for each film (but not the extras from the previous releases).

Warner Bros. released the trilogy's theatrical versions on Blu-ray in a boxed set on 6 April 2010. An extended edition Blu-ray box set was released on 28 June 2011. Each film's extended Blu-ray version is identical to the extended DVD version, including the appendices. In 2014, Blu-ray steelbook editions of the five-disc extended editions were released. The first, The Fellowship of the Ring, was released on 24 March 2014. The discs are identical to those found in the previous five-disc Blu-ray set. The Blu-ray releases were criticized for colour timing issues which degraded the look of the films.The Lord of the Rings trilogy was released in Ultra HD Blu-ray in 2020, featuring both the theatrical and extended editions of the films. The films, along with those of The Hobbit trilogy, were remastered to give all six films a more consistent colour treatment. A 31-disc collector's set including both versions of all six films in 4K and Blu-ray formats, was released in 2021 for the 20-year anniversary of the first film; this, however, does not include the appendices.

, The Lord of the Rings films had a home media revenue of more than $2.4 billion.

 Legacy 
The release of the films saw a surge of interest in The Lord of the Rings and Tolkien's other works, vastly increasing his impact on popular culture. The success of the films spawned numerous video games and many other kinds of merchandise.

 The Hobbit trilogy 

From 2012 to 2014 Peter Jackson and his studio Wingnut Films made The Hobbit trilogy consisting of the films The Hobbit: An Unexpected Journey, The Hobbit: The Desolation of Smaug and The Hobbit: The Battle of the Five Armies. The trilogy works as a prequel to The Lord of the Rings films.

 The War of the Rohirrim 
	
In 2024, a stand-alone animated prequel film to Peter Jackson's The Lord of the Rings films, titled The War of the Rohirrim, will be released. It is directed by Kenji Kamiyama, with Miranda Otto reprising her role from live-action, serving as the film's narrator.

 Reunion 

On 31 May 2020, through his YouTube channel, actor Josh Gad aired a virtual cast reunion via Zoom as the fourth episode of the web series Reunited Apart, a charity fundraising effort during the COVID-19 pandemic, with The Lord of the Rings reunion supporting Share Our Strength's campaign called "No Kid Hungry". A large part of the original cast participated, including Sean Astin, Sean Bean, Orlando Bloom, Billy Boyd, Bernard Hill, Ian McKellen, Dominic Monaghan, Viggo Mortensen, Miranda Otto, John Rhys-Davies, Andy Serkis, Liv Tyler, Karl Urban and Elijah Wood. The director Peter Jackson, screenwriter Philippa Boyens and composer Howard Shore were present. On 2 June 2020, Josh Gad announced that the charity had raised over $100,000.

 Effects on the film industry and tourism 

As a result of the series' success, Peter Jackson has become a major figure in the film industry in the mould of Steven Spielberg and George Lucas, in the process befriending some industry heavyweights like Bryan Singer and Frank Darabont. Jackson has since founded his own film production company, Wingnut Films, as well as Wingnut Interactive, a video game company. He was also finally given a chance to remake King Kong in 2005. The film was a critical and box office success, although not as successful as The Lord of the Rings series. Jackson has been called a "favourite son" of New Zealand. In 2004, Howard Shore toured with The Lord of the Rings Symphony, playing two hours of the score. Along with the Harry Potter films, the series has renewed interest in the fantasy film genre. Tourism in New Zealand is up, possibly due to its exposure in the series, with the country's tourism industry waking up to an audience's familiarity.

In 2002 the Museum of New Zealand Te Papa Tongarewa in Wellington created a travelling exhibition of the film trilogy, The Lord of the Rings Motion Picture Trilogy: The Exhibition. It visited cities around the world including Boston, London, Sydney, Singapore and Houston.

 Legal disputes The Lord of the Rings left a legacy of court cases over profits from the trilogy. Sixteen cast members (Noel Appleby, Jed Brophy, Mark Ferguson, Ray Henwood, Bruce Hopkins, William Johnson, Nathaniel Lees, Sarah McLeod, Ian Mune, Paul Norell, Craig Parker, Robert Pollock, Martyn Sanderson, Peter Tait and Stephen Ure) sued over the lack of revenue from merchandise bearing their appearance. The case was resolved out of court in 2008. The settlement came too late for Appleby, who died of cancer in 2007. Saul Zaentz also filed a lawsuit in 2004 claiming he had not been paid all of his royalties.

The next year, Jackson himself sued the studio over profits from the first film, slowing development of The Hobbit prequels until late 2007. The Tolkien Trust filed a lawsuit in February 2008, for violating Tolkien's original deal over the rights that they would earn 7.5% of the gross from any films based on his works. The Trust sought compensation of $150 million. A judge denied them this option, but allowed them to win compensation from the act of the studio ignoring the contract itself. On 8 September 2009, the dispute was settled.

 Video games 

Numerous video games were released to supplement the film series. They are The Two Towers, The Return of the King, The Third Age, The Third Age (Game Boy Advance), Tactics, The Battle for Middle-earth, The Battle for Middle-earth II, The Battle for Middle-earth II: The Rise of the Witch-king, Conquest, Aragorn's Quest, War in the North, Lego The Lord of the Rings, Guardians of Middle-earth, Middle-earth: Shadow of Mordor, and Middle-earth: Shadow of War''.

Notes

References

Sources cited

External links 

 
 
 
 
 
 

 
Adventure film series
Film series introduced in 2001
New Line Cinema franchises
Films based on The Lord of the Rings
Fantasy film series
American film series
New Zealand film series
Film series based on fantasy novels
Film series based on British novels